John Philip Kelly, CMG, LVO, MBE (born 25 June 1941) is an Irish-born British diplomat who was Governor of the British overseas territory of the Turks and Caicos Islands from October 1996 to January 2000.

Kelly was born in Tuam, County Galway and emigrated to England in 1958. He joined Her Majesty's Diplomatic Service in 1959, and served at various British embassies and high commissions, and at the Foreign and Commonwealth Office in London.

Kelly was appointed a Member of the Order of the British Empire (MBE) in 1984. In 1989, he became Deputy Governor of Bermuda and was made a Lieutenant in the Royal Victorian Order (LVO) when Queen Elizabeth II visited the island in  1994. He retired from the FCO in 2000, and was awarded the CMG (Companion of the Order of St Michael and St George) in the Queen's Birthday honours that year.

External links

World Statesmen information on the Turks and Caicos

20th-century Irish people
1941 births
Living people
Governors of the Turks and Caicos Islands
Deputy Governors of Bermuda
Companions of the Order of St Michael and St George
Lieutenants of the Royal Victorian Order
British diplomats
Members of the Order of the British Empire
Irish emigrants to the United Kingdom
People from Tuam
People from County Galway